Jacob Hinds (1800 – October 20, 1873) was an American politician from New York.

Life
In 1826, he married Almira Waldron (1805–1874), and they had five children, among them Franklin Hinds, Harrison Hinds, Mary Katherine Hinds (1832–1913) and Minerva A. Hinds (1830–1890).

About 1830, he removed to Murray, Orleans County, New York, and was among the founders of the village of Hindsburgh (now Hinsburg).

During the administration of Governor William H. Seward, he was appointed Superintendent of Canal Repairs for a section of the Erie Canal.

He was one of the first three Canal Commissioners elected under the New York State Constitution of 1846, and drew the three-year term, being in office from 1848 to 1850. In 1850, he was accused of misadministration, but defended himself successfully before a special committee of the New York State Legislature.

Sources
The New York Civil List compiled by Franklin Benjamin Hough (page 42; Weed, Parsons and Co., 1858) [gives "Tonawanda" as residence for Hinds]
The New York Annual Register (1840; page 394)
Reimbursement of his legal fees, in The Laws of the State of New York (Seventy-eighth Session, 1855; pages 1024f)
The New York Mercantile Union Business Directory (1849; page 412) [gives "Hindsville" as residence for Hinds]
The Pioneer History of Orleans County, NY, Chapter XXIV, The Village of Hindsburgh by Arad Thomas
 Burial records from Mt. Albion Cemetery, Albion NY, at RootsWeb
 Burial records from Transit Cemetery, Murray NY, at RootsWeb
 Waldron genealogy

1800 births
1873 deaths
People from Murray, New York
Erie Canal Commissioners